This is a list of results for the matches played by the Basque Country national football team (the association football team representing the 'Greater Basque Region', territories which are ultimately administered by France and Spain and their respective governing bodies in the sport), including unofficial friendly fixtures against full FIFA international teams, others against fellow representative teams which are not aligned to FIFA, and matches against professional clubs.

Since the 1990s, they have concentrated on arranging fixtures likely to improve perception of the team being accepted as a full international selection, as opposed to entering competitions for regions such as the CONIFA World Football Cup.

Results against FIFA national teams

1922 Gipuzcoan Federation matches

As Basque Country

The two main periods of match activity occurred in the late 1930s during the Spanish Civil War when the Basque team 'in exile' toured Europe and Latin America (where most of the players then settled), and from 1993 onwards when one match has been played almost every year.

Notes

Record versus FIFA national teams
Including 1922 South America tour

Results against non-FIFA national/regional teams

North Federation matches

As Basque Country

Record vs Non-FIFA teams / As 'North' region

Non-international matches

See also
 Basque Football Federation
 Biscay Championship
 Gipuzkoa Championship
 List of Basque footballers

References

External links
 Basque Football Federation 
 Euskal Selekzioa Online 

Basque Country
Association football in Spain lists
Basque Country national football team
Basq